Calodesma maculifrons is a moth of the family Erebidae. It was described by Francis Walker in 1865. It is found in Mexico, Honduras, Costa Rica, Guatemala, Panama and Ecuador.

Adults are sexually dimorphic. Males have a yellow or orange ground colour, while females have a black ground colour.

Larvae have been reared on several various Malpighiaceae species.

References

Calodesma
Moths described in 1865